Fire Brigade SC is the most successful football club in Mauritius with 13 league titles, 12 Mauritian cups and 3 Republic cups. There was a great rivalry between Sunrise Flacq United and Fire Brigade SC. Both clubs met four times in the Republic Cup finals with Sunrise Flacq United winning all four matches.

Honours 
Mauritian League: 13
1942, 1950, 1961, 1973, 1974, 1979–80, 1982–83, 1983–84, 1984–85, 1987–88, 1992–93, 1993–94, 1998–99
Mauritian Cup: 12
1980, 1981, 1982, 1983, 1986, 1989, 1990, 1991, 1994, 1995, 1997, 1998
Mauritian Republic Cup: 3
1991, 1995, 1999

References

External links

Football clubs in Mauritius
Works association football teams